Pati Ba Pintig ng Puso? (International title: Of Love and Lies / ) is a 2007 Philippine television drama romance series broadcast by GMA Network. Based on a 1985 Philippine film of the same title, the series is the second instalment of Sine Novela. Directed by Gil Tejada Jr., it stars Yasmien Kurdi and JC de Vera. It premiered on May 21, 2007 on the network's Dramarama sa Hapon line up replacing Muli. The series concluded on September 7, 2007 with a total of 80 episodes. It was replaced by Pasan Ko ang Daigdig in its timeslot.

Cast and characters

Lead cast
 JC de Vera as Aldrin Griego
 Yasmien Kurdi as Jenna

Supporting cast
 Eddie Gutierrez as Griego
 Chynna Ortaleza as Mabelle
 Karel Marquez as Agatha
 Arci Muñoz as Claire
 Jennifer Sevilla as Rosa
 Marco Alcaraz as Bien
 Pinky Amador as Nena
 Kier Legaspi as Franco
 Maureen Larrazabal as Betty
 Marcus Madrigal as Jeffrey
 Karen delos Reyes as Sosima
 Sweet Ramos as Kaykay
 Ramon Christopher Gutierrez as Ricardo

Guest cast
 Bea Binene as young Jenna
 Miguel Tanfelix as young Aldrin
 Krystal Reyes as young Claire
 Ella Guevara as young Betty

References

External links
 

2007 Philippine television series debuts
2007 Philippine television series endings
Filipino-language television shows
GMA Network drama series
Live action television shows based on films
Philippine romance television series
Television shows set in the Philippines